Juan Barea (born 15 March 1931) is an Argentine former basketball player.

References

1931 births
Living people
Argentine men's basketball players
Basketball players at the 1955 Pan American Games
Pan American Games silver medalists for Argentina
Pan American Games medalists in basketball
Medalists at the 1955 Pan American Games